Manfred Hellmann (born 16 August 1962) is a German former professional footballer.

Hellmann made 44 appearances in the Bundesliga and 101 appearances in the 2. Bundesliga during his playing career.

References

External links 
 

1962 births
Living people
People from Cloppenburg
Footballers from Lower Saxony
German footballers
Association football defenders
Bundesliga players
2. Bundesliga players
Atlas Delmenhorst players
VfB Oldenburg players
KFC Uerdingen 05 players
Tennis Borussia Berlin players